Ralph Slater (1754–1830) was an English millwright, active in the second half of the 18th century and early 19th, ostensibly known for his windmills on the Fylde in Lancashire, England. One of them, Marsh Mill, is a Grade II* listed building. He was from Pilling.

Personal life
Slater was born in 1754 in Barton, Preston. He married Margery Speakman (1742–1814) on 25 April 1775. They had four children together.

He died in 1830, aged 75 or 76.

Selected works

Marsh Mill, Thornton (1794)
Damside Windmill, Pilling (1808)
Clifton Mill, Clifton

References
Footnotes

Sources

1754 births
1830 deaths
Millwrights
People from Pilling
18th-century British engineers
19th-century British engineers